Some People's Lives is the seventh studio album by American singer Bette Midler. It was released by Atlantic Records on September 4, 1990 in the United States. It contains one of her biggest hits, "From a Distance," which won songwriter Julie Gold a Grammy Award for Song of the Year in 1991.

Some People's Lives became the biggest commercial success of Midler's musical career, peaking at number 6 in the US and number 5 in the UK. It was later awarded double platinum by the RIAA for sales of over two million copies in the US alone.

Background
Following a series of successful Hollywood movies made throughout the 1980s, among them Down and Out in Beverly Hills, Ruthless People, Outrageous Fortune, Oliver and Company and Big Business, Midler returned to the music scene with a proper studio album in 1990, her first since 1983's rock and new wave-influenced No Frills. Some People's Lives, however, had more in common with the preceding soundtrack Beaches in that it featured both interpretations of jazz standards like "Miss Otis Regrets", "Spring Can Really Hang You Up the Most" and "He Was Too Good to Me" as well as more chart-oriented pop and adult contemporary material with contrasting synth-driven arrangements courtesy of producer Arif Mardin, his son Joe and Robbie Buchanan. The up-tempo track "Moonlight Dancing" (first recorded by pop/R&B group The Pointer Sisters) was written by noted hitmaker Diane Warren and "The Gift of Love" by Tom Kelly and Billy Steinberg and Susanna Hoffs. Steinberg and Kelly were the songwriting team behind Madonna's "Like a Virgin", Cyndi Lauper's "True Colors" and The Bangles' "Eternal Flame".

Promotion
"Moonlight Dancing" (also released as an extended dance remix which sampled the 1973 recording "Do You Want to Dance"), "Night and Day" and "The Gift of Love" were all issued as singles, but the biggest hit that the album produced was Midler's interpretation of Julie Gold's anthem of universal brotherhood "From a Distance" featuring The Radio Choir of New Hope Church. The single reached number 2 on the Billboard Hot 100 chart, number 1 on the Adult Contemporary chart and number 6 in the UK and was later certified platinum in the US, making it Midler's second million-seller within the space of two years (following "Wind Beneath My Wings" from the Beaches soundtrack). The song has since been recorded by a large number of other artists, and Midler herself included an alternate version with partly re-written lyrics on her 2006 album Cool Yule.

Critical reception

AllMusic editor Bryan Buss called the album "one of the singer's strongest collections." He felt that aside from "poor production" on "From a Distance," Some People's Lives was "a smooth collection of standards [...] This is Midler at her best – playful, yearning, brassy, regretful – and that is mostly because producer Arif Mardin surrounds his star with respectful production that matches her talent while accenting her strengths." Los Angeles Times critic Dennis Hunt critisized the album for its "overload of whiny, dirge-like ballads [...] Fortunately, there's nothing on the album quite as unabashedly sentimental as "Wind Beneath My Wings," but many of the songs have those same sappy overtones."

Commercial performance
Some People's Lives became the biggest commercial success of Midler's musical career. It reached its highest peak in the United Kingdom, where it entered the top five and reached gold status in July 1991. In the United States, it peaked at number 6 on the US Billboard 200, becoming her highest-charting album since Bette Midler (1973). Exceeding shipments of more than 2 million copies, it was certified double platinum by the Recording Industry Association of America (RIAA) in March 1991. Elsewhere, the album entered the top ten in Australia, Canada, and New Zealand, while reaching number 15 on the German Albums Chart and number 27 on the Austrian Albums Chart.

Some People's Lives was classified as the 36th best-selling album of 1991 in Australia. In Canada, the set became the 60th most-selling album in 1990, while in 1991 it scored at number 36 on the End-of-Year chart. Billboard ranked it 16th on its 1991 year-end chart.

Track listing

Personnel
Musicians

 Bette Midler – all vocals (1-6, 8, 9), lead vocals (7, 10)
 Joe Mardin – keyboards (1, 5, 8, 10), programming (1, 5, 8, 10), arrangements (1, 8, 10), keyboard solo (5), conductor (8), backing vocals (10)
 Marc Shaiman – arrangements (1-4, 6), acoustic piano (2, 9), conductor (2, 3, 4, 6), vocal arrangements (7, 8), basic rhythm arrangements (9)
 Bernie Layton – acoustic piano (3)
 Robbie Buchanan – keyboards (6, 7, 11), programming (6, 11), additional programming (8)
 Michael Boddicker – additional synthesizers (6), additional programming (11)
 Guy Roche – additional programming (8)
 Gene Bertoncini – guitar (3)
 Michael Landau – guitar (6, 7)
 Dean Parks – guitar (6, 11)
 John McCurry – guitar (10)
 Andrew Gold – guitar solo (11)
 Ron Carter – bass (3)
 Neil Stubenhaus – bass (6, 7, 11)
 Jay Leonhart – bass (9)
 Grady Tate – drums (3)
 Carlos Vega – drums (6, 7, 11)
 Steve Kroon – percussion (1)
 Gary Coleman – percussion (6)
 Phil Bodner – clarinet solo (3)
 Nino Tempo – tenor saxophone (4)
 Andy Snitzer – soprano sax solo (6)
 Arif Mardin – arrangements (1, 5, 7, 11), orchestral arrangements and conductor (9)
 Billie Hughes – arrangements (5)
 Steve Skinner – arrangements (7)
 Sid Page – concertmaster (2)
 Bruce Dukov – concertmaster (4)
 Gene Orloff – concertmaster (9)
 Charlotte Crossley – backing vocals (7)
 Cissy Houston – backing vocals (7)
 Jo Ann Harris – backing vocals (7)
 David Lasley – backing vocals (7)
 Myrna Smith – backing vocals (7)
 Gene Van Buren – backing vocals (7)
 John West – backing vocals (7)
 The Radio Choir of New Hope Church – backing vocals (7)
 Ula Hedwig – backing vocals (10)
 George Merrill – backing vocals (10)
 Tom Kelly – backing vocals (11), vocal arrangements (11)
 Maria Vidal – backing vocals (11)

Production

 Arif Mardin – producer
 Marc Shaiman – associate producer
 Jack Joseph Puig – recording, mixing 
 Joe Mardin – additional recording (1), additional mixing (1)
 Eddie Garcia – additional recording (1), additional mixing (1)
 Michael O'Reilly – additional recording (1), additional mixing (1)
 Nick Sansano – additional recording (1), additional mixing (1)
 Ken Felton – assistant engineer
 Rob Harvey – assistant engineer
 Ed Korengo – assistant engineer
 Bob Loftus – assistant engineer
 Gabriel Moffat – assistant engineer 
 James Nichols – assistant engineer
 Clif Norrell – assistant engineer
 Anthony Saunders – assistant engineer
 Jamie Staub – assistant engineer
 Doug Sax – mastering
 Marsha Burns – production coordination
 Lisa Maldonado – additional coordination
 Vicky Germaise – additional coordination
 Frank DeCaro – orchestra contractor 
 Gene Orloff – orchestra contractor
 Greg Gorman – photography
 Bob Defrin – art direction, design 

Studios
 Recorded at Ocean Way Recording (Hollywood, California); Studio 55 and Studio Ultimo (Los Angeles, California); Electric Lady Studios, Battery Studios, BMG Studios and Greene St. Recording (New York City, New York).
 Mixed at Studio 55 and Electric Lady Studios.
 Mastered at The Mastering Lab (Hollywood, California).

Charts

Weekly charts

Year-end charts

Certifications

References

1990 albums
Bette Midler albums
Albums produced by Arif Mardin
Atlantic Records albums